Kula Botanical Garden is a  botanical garden located on Kekaulike Highway (Highway 377) near the Kula Highway (Highway 37) junction in Maui, Hawaii. It is open daily. An admission fee of $10.00 for adults and $3 for children ages 6–12 is charged. Children under six are admitted free.

The garden was created in 1977 by Warren McCord as a native Hawaiian plant reserve. It was Maui's first public garden. For both tropical and semitropical species. Today the garden contains nearly 2,000 plant varieties, including collections of protea, orchids, bromeliads, native Hawaiian plants, and trees including koa and kukui. Other features include an aviary, a koi pond, waterfalls, and a covered bridge.

External links
Official website

Botanical gardens in Hawaii
Protected areas of Maui
Protected areas established in 1977
1977 establishments in Hawaii